Broken Arrow is a Western series which ran on ABC-TV in prime time from 1956 through 1958 on Tuesdays at 9 p.m. Eastern time. Repeat episodes were shown by ABC on Sunday afternoons during the 1959-60 TV season and in an early evening timeslot Sunday evenings from April to September 1960.

Synopsis

The cowboys and Indians got together to battle injustice in this Western, which starred John Lupton as Indian agent Tom Jeffords and Michael Ansara as Apache Chief Cochise.

Jeffords was originally an army officer given the assignment of getting the U.S. Mail safely through Apache territory in Arizona. Adopting the novel approach of making friends with the Indians instead of shooting at them, Jeffords soon became blood brother to Cochise. Together they fought both renegades from the Chiricahua Reservation and dishonest "white eyes" who preyed upon the Indians.

The show was based on the 1947 novel Blood Brother, by Elliott Arnold, which had been made into a film in 1950, starring James Stewart as Tom Jeffords and Jeff Chandler playing as Cochise.

Episodes

Season 1 (1956–57)

Season 2 (1957–58)

References

Sources
 Brooks, Tim and Marsh, Earle, The Complete Directory to Prime Time Network and Cable TV Shows

External links
 

1950s Western (genre) television series
1956 American television series debuts
1958 American television series endings
American Broadcasting Company original programming
Black-and-white American television shows
Television shows based on American novels
Television series by 20th Century Fox Television
Television shows set in Arizona
Television shows set in Tucson, Arizona
Television shows about Native Americans